Podgorny (masculine), Podgornaya (feminine), or Podgornoye (neuter) is the name of several  rural localities in Russia.

Republic of Adygea
As of 2010, two rural localities in the Republic of Adygea bear this name:
Podgorny, Maykop, Republic of Adygea, a settlement under the administrative jurisdiction of the Maykop Republican Urban Okrug
Podgorny, Maykopsky District, Republic of Adygea, a settlement in Maykopsky District

Altai Krai
As of 2010, one rural locality in Altai Krai bears this name:
Podgorny, Altai Krai, a settlement in Krutishinsky Selsoviet of Shelabolikhinsky District

Altai Republic
As of 2010, one rural locality in the Altai Republic bears this name:
Podgornoye, Altai Republic, a selo in Mayminskoye Rural Settlement of Mayminsky District

Amur Oblast
As of 2010, one rural locality in Amur Oblast bears this name:
Podgorny, Amur Oblast, a settlement in Novgorodsky Rural Settlement of Svobodnensky District

Republic of Bashkortostan
As of 2010, two rural localities in the Republic of Bashkortostan bear this name:
Podgorny, Republic of Bashkortostan, a village in Makarovsky Selsoviet of Ishimbaysky District
Podgornoye, Republic of Bashkortostan, a selo in Chapayevsky Selsoviet of Kugarchinsky District

Belgorod Oblast
As of 2010, one rural locality in Belgorod Oblast bears this name:
Podgornoye, Belgorod Oblast, a selo in Podgorensky Rural Okrug of Valuysky District

Republic of Buryatia
As of 2010, one rural locality in the Republic of Buryatia bears this name:
Podgornoye, Republic of Buryatia, a selo in Topkinsky Selsoviet of Bichursky District

Chechen Republic
As of 2010, one rural locality in the Chechen Republic bears this name:
Podgornoye, Chechen Republic, a selo in Nadterechny District

Chelyabinsk Oblast
As of 2010, three rural localities in Chelyabinsk Oblast bear this name:
Podgorny, Nagaybaksky District, Chelyabinsk Oblast, a settlement in Kasselsky Selsoviet of Nagaybaksky District
Podgorny, Uvelsky District, Chelyabinsk Oblast, a settlement in Kamensky Selsoviet of Uvelsky District
Podgornoye, Chelyabinsk Oblast, a selo in Kosobrodsky Selsoviet of Troitsky District

Irkutsk Oblast
As of 2010, two rural localities in Irkutsk Oblast bear this name:
Podgorny, Irkutsk Oblast, a settlement in Nizhneudinsky District
Podgornaya, Irkutsk Oblast, a village in Ziminsky District

Kaliningrad Oblast
As of 2010, four rural localities in Kaliningrad Oblast bear this name:
Podgornoye, Bagrationovsky District, Kaliningrad Oblast, a settlement in Dolgorukovsky Rural Okrug of Bagrationovsky District
Podgornoye, Chernyakhovsky District, Kaliningrad Oblast, a settlement in Svobodnensky Rural Okrug of Chernyakhovsky District
Podgornoye, Guryevsky District, Kaliningrad Oblast, a settlement in Nizovsky Rural Okrug of Guryevsky District
Podgornoye, Nemansky District, Kaliningrad Oblast, a settlement under the administrative jurisdiction of Neman Town of District Significance of Nemansky District

Republic of Karelia
As of 2010, one rural locality in the Republic of Karelia bears this name:
Podgornaya, Republic of Karelia, a village in Kondopozhsky District

Kemerovo Oblast
As of 2010, three rural localities in Kemerovo Oblast bear this name:
Podgorny, Kemerovo Oblast, a settlement in Bungurskaya Rural Territory of Mezhdurechensky District
Podgornoye, Kemerovo Oblast, a selo in Podgornovskaya Rural Territory of Leninsk-Kuznetsky District
Podgornaya, Kemerovo Oblast, a village in Kurtukovskaya Rural Territory of Mezhdurechensky District

Khabarovsk Krai
As of 2010, one rural locality in Khabarovsk Krai bears this name:
Podgornoye, Khabarovsk Krai, a selo in Nikolayevsky District

Kirov Oblast
As of 2010, five rural localities in Kirov Oblast bear this name:
Podgorny, Kirov Oblast, a settlement under the administrative jurisdiction of   the town of Murashi, Murashinsky District
Podgornoye, Belokholunitsky District, Kirov Oblast, a village in Gurensky Rural Okrug of Belokholunitsky District
Podgornoye, Slobodskoy District, Kirov Oblast, a village in Svetozarevsky Rural Okrug of Slobodskoy District
Podgornaya, Pizhansky District, Kirov Oblast, a village in Izhevsky Rural Okrug of Pizhansky District
Podgornaya, Sovetsky District, Kirov Oblast, a village in Rodyginsky Rural Okrug of Sovetsky District

Kostroma Oblast
As of 2010, one rural locality in Kostroma Oblast bears this name:
Podgorny, Kostroma Oblast, a settlement in Dmitriyevskoye Settlement of Galichsky District

Krasnoyarsk Krai
As of 2010, three rural localities in Krasnoyarsk Krai bear this name:
Podgorny, Zheleznogorsk, Krasnoyarsk Krai, a settlement under the administrative jurisdiction of the closed administrative-territorial formation of Zheleznogorsk
Podgorny, Kuraginsky District, Krasnoyarsk Krai, a settlement in Roshchinsky Selsoviet of Kuraginsky District
Podgornoye, Krasnoyarsk Krai, a selo in Podgornovsky Selsoviet of Yeniseysky District

Kurgan Oblast
As of 2010, one rural locality in Kurgan Oblast bears this name:
Podgornaya, Kurgan Oblast, a village in Berezovsky Selsoviet of Pritobolny District

Leningrad Oblast
As of 2010, one rural locality in Leningrad Oblast bears this name:
Podgornoye, Leningrad Oblast, a logging depot settlement in Pervomayskoye Settlement Municipal Formation of Vyborgsky District

Lipetsk Oblast
As of 2010, three rural localities in Lipetsk Oblast bear this name:
Podgornoye, Khlevensky District, Lipetsk Oblast, a village in Sindyakinsky Selsoviet of Khlevensky District
Podgornoye, Lipetsky District, Lipetsk Oblast, a selo in Syrsky Selsoviet of Lipetsky District
Podgornaya, Lipetsk Oblast, a village in Georgiyevsky Selsoviet of Stanovlyansky District

Mari El Republic
As of 2010, two rural localities in the Mari El Republic bear this name:
Podgornoye, Mari El Republic, a village in Maryinsky Rural Okrug of Yurinsky District
Podgornaya, Mari El Republic, a village under the administrative jurisdiction of  the urban-type settlement of Morki, Morkinsky District

Moscow Oblast
As of 2010, one rural locality in Moscow Oblast bears this name:
Podgornoye, Moscow Oblast, a village in Gabovskoye Rural Settlement of Dmitrovsky District

Novgorod Oblast
As of 2010, two rural localities in Novgorod Oblast bear this name:
Podgornoye, Novgorod Oblast, a village in Verebyinskoye Settlement of Malovishersky District
Podgornaya, Novgorod Oblast, a village in Polnovskoye Settlement of Demyansky District

Novosibirsk Oblast
As of 2010, one rural locality in Novosibirsk Oblast bears this name:
Podgornaya, Novosibirsk Oblast, a village under the administrative jurisdiction of  the work settlement of Kolyvan, Kolyvansky District

Orenburg Oblast
As of 2010, four rural localities in Orenburg Oblast bear this name:
Podgorny, Alexandrovsky District, Orenburg Oblast, a settlement in Alexandrovsky Selsoviet of Alexandrovsky District
Podgorny, Buzuluksky District, Orenburg Oblast, a settlement in Troitsky Selsoviet of Buzuluksky District
Podgorny, Sharlyksky District, Orenburg Oblast, a settlement in Sarmanaysky Selsoviet of Sharlyksky District
Podgornoye, Orenburg Oblast, a selo in Ilyinsky Selsoviet of Kuvandyksky District

Penza Oblast
As of 2010, four rural localities in Penza Oblast bear this name:
Podgorny, Nizhnelomovsky District, Penza Oblast, a settlement in Golitsynsky Selsoviet of Nizhnelomovsky District
Podgorny, Pachelmsky District, Penza Oblast, a settlement in Novotolkovsky Selsoviet of Pachelmsky District
Podgornoye, Bashmakovsky District, Penza Oblast, a selo in Podgornsky Selsoviet of Bashmakovsky District
Podgornoye, Mokshansky District, Penza Oblast, a selo in Podgornensky Selsoviet of Mokshansky District

Perm Krai
As of 2010, two rural localities in Perm Krai bear this name:
Podgornaya, Cherdynsky District, Perm Krai, a settlement in Cherdynsky District
Podgornaya, Ochyorsky District, Perm Krai, a village in Ochyorsky District

Primorsky Krai
As of 2010, one rural locality in Primorsky Krai bears this name:
Podgornoye, Primorsky Krai, a selo in Kirovsky District

Rostov Oblast
As of 2010, two rural localities in Rostov Oblast bear this name:
Podgorny, Rostov Oblast, a khutor in Bolshekirsanovskoye Rural Settlement of Matveyevo-Kurgansky District
Podgornoye, Rostov Oblast, a selo in Podgornenskoye Rural Settlement of Remontnensky District

Sakhalin Oblast
As of 2010, one rural locality in Sakhalin Oblast bears this name:
Podgornoye, Sakhalin Oblast, a selo in Tymovsky District

Samara Oblast
As of 2010, two rural localities in Samara Oblast bear this name:
Podgorny, Samara Oblast, a settlement in Kinel-Cherkassky District
Podgornoye, Samara Oblast, a selo in Borsky District

Saratov Oblast
As of 2010, four rural localities in Saratov Oblast bear this name:
Podgornoye, Arkadaksky District, Saratov Oblast, a selo in Arkadaksky District
Podgornoye, Engelssky District, Saratov Oblast, a selo in Engelssky District
Podgornoye, Romanovsky District, Saratov Oblast, a selo in Romanovsky District
Podgornoye, Voskresensky District, Saratov Oblast, a selo in Voskresensky District

Smolensk Oblast
As of 2010, one rural locality in Smolensk Oblast bears this name:
Podgornoye, Smolensk Oblast, a village under the administrative jurisdiction of Yelninskoye Urban Settlement of Yelninsky District

Stavropol Krai
As of 2010, three rural localities in Stavropol Krai bear this name:
Podgorny, Stavropol Krai, a khutor under the administrative jurisdiction of the town of Mikhaylovsk, Shpakovsky District
Podgornoye, Stavropol Krai, a selo in Kazinsky Selsoviet of Andropovsky District
Podgornaya, Stavropol Krai, a stanitsa in Podgornaya Selsoviet of Georgiyevsky District

Tambov Oblast
As of 2010, three rural localities in Tambov Oblast bear this name:
Podgorny, Tambov Oblast, a settlement in Kaluginsky Selsoviet of Inzhavinsky District
Podgornoye, Staroyuryevsky District, Tambov Oblast, a selo in Podgornensky Selsoviet of Staroyuryevsky District
Podgornoye, Uvarovsky District, Tambov Oblast, a selo in Podgornensky Selsoviet of Uvarovsky District

Republic of Tatarstan
As of 2010, two rural localities in the Republic of Tatarstan bear this name:
Podgorny, Bugulminsky District, Republic of Tatarstan, a settlement in Bugulminsky District
Podgorny, Yutazinsky District, Republic of Tatarstan, a settlement in Yutazinsky District

Tomsk Oblast
As of 2010, one rural locality in Tomsk Oblast bears this name:
Podgornoye, Tomsk Oblast, a selo in Chainsky District

Udmurt Republic
As of 2010, three rural localities in the Udmurt Republic bear this name:
Podgorny, Udmurt Republic, a village in Bolshekivarsky Selsoviet of Votkinsky District
Podgornoye, Udmurt Republic, a selo in Podgornovsky Selsoviet of Kiyasovsky District
Podgornaya, Udmurt Republic, a village in Melnikovsky Selsoviet of Mozhginsky District

Ulyanovsk Oblast
As of 2010, one rural locality in Ulyanovsk Oblast bears this name:
Podgorny, Ulyanovsk Oblast, a settlement in Oskinsky Rural Okrug of Inzensky District

Volgograd Oblast
As of 2010, one rural locality in Volgograd Oblast bears this name:
Podgorny, Volgograd Oblast, a khutor in Tryasinovsky Selsoviet of Serafimovichsky District

Vologda Oblast
As of 2010, ten rural localities in Vologda Oblast bear this name:
Podgorny, Vologda Oblast, a settlement in Churovsky Selsoviet of Sheksninsky District
Podgornaya, Demyanovsky Selsoviet, Babushkinsky District, Vologda Oblast, a village in Demyanovsky Selsoviet of Babushkinsky District
Podgornaya, Timanovsky Selsoviet, Babushkinsky District, Vologda Oblast, a village in Timanovsky Selsoviet of Babushkinsky District
Podgornaya, Kirillovsky District, Vologda Oblast, a village in Volokoslavinsky Selsoviet of Kirillovsky District
Podgornaya, Korobitsinsky Selsoviet, Syamzhensky District, Vologda Oblast, a village in Korobitsinsky Selsoviet of Syamzhensky District
Podgornaya, Zhityevsky Selsoviet, Syamzhensky District, Vologda Oblast, a village in Zhityevsky Selsoviet of Syamzhensky District
Podgornaya, Shebengsky Selsoviet, Tarnogsky District, Vologda Oblast, a village in Shebengsky Selsoviet of Tarnogsky District
Podgornaya, Shevdenitsky Selsoviet, Tarnogsky District, Vologda Oblast, a village in Shevdenitsky Selsoviet of Tarnogsky District
Podgornaya, Totemsky District, Vologda Oblast, a village in Pogorelovsky Selsoviet of Totemsky District
Podgornaya, Vashkinsky District, Vologda Oblast, a village in Porechensky Selsoviet of Vashkinsky District

Voronezh Oblast
As of 2010, five rural localities in Voronezh Oblast bear this name:
Podgornoye, Voronezh, Voronezh Oblast, a selo under the administrative jurisdiction of Voronezh Urban Okrug
Podgornoye, Kalacheyevsky District, Voronezh Oblast, a selo in Podgorenskoye Rural Settlement of Kalacheyevsky District
Podgornoye, Novokhopyorsky District, Voronezh Oblast, a selo in Podgorenskoye Rural Settlement of Novokhopyorsky District
Podgornoye, Podgorensky District, Voronezh Oblast, a sloboda under the administrative jurisdiction of Podgorenskoye Urban Settlement of Podgorensky District
Podgornoye, Rossoshansky District, Voronezh Oblast, a selo in Podgorenskoye Rural Settlement of Rossoshansky District